Tristira is a genus of flowering plants belonging to the family Sapindaceae.

Its native range is Philippines, Sulawesi and Maluku.

Species:
 Tristira triptera (Blanco) Radlk.

References

Sapindaceae
Sapindaceae genera